Cannelville is an unincorporated community in Muskingum County, in the U.S. state of Ohio.

History
A post office was established at Cannelville in 1908, and remained in operation until 1923. The community was named for cannel coal deposits mined near the original town site.

References

Unincorporated communities in Muskingum County, Ohio
1908 establishments in Ohio
Unincorporated communities in Ohio